Benoni Beheyt (born 27 September 1940) is a Belgian former professional road bicycle racer who raced from 1962 to 1968.  Beheyt won 22 races and is most famous for winning the 1963 World Cycling Championships Road Race and stage win of the 1964 Tour de France. He also competed in the individual road race and team time trial events at the 1960 Summer Olympics.

Major results

1962 – Wiel's-Groene Leeuw
 1st Brussel–Ingooigem
 2nd Overall Tour du Nord
 1st stage 1 
 1st stage 2 Tour de Picardie
 1st Melle
 2nd Omloop van Oost-Vlaanderen
 3rd Paris–Tours
 3rd Nationale Sluitingsprijs
1963 – Wiel's-Groene Leeuw
 1st  Road race, UCI Road World Championships
 1st Gent–Wevelgem
 1st Grand Prix de Fourmies
 1st Overall Tour de Wallonie
 1st Antwerpen - Ougrée
 1st St-Andries
 1st Bruxelles-Alsemberg
 1st Gavere
 2nd Omloop van Midden-Vlaanderen
 2nd La Roue d'Or (with Noël Foré)
 3rd Grand Prix de Denain
 3rd Nationale Sluitingsprijs
 3rd Boulogne
1964 – Wiel's-Groene Leeuw
 49th Overall Tour de France
 1st Stage 22a (Orléans – Versailles, 118.5 km)
 1st Overall Tour of Belgium
 Circuit du Provençal
 1st stage 1a and 2b
 1st La Ronde d'Aix-en-Provence
 1st Bourcefranc
 1st Callac
 1st Ronde van Oost-Vlaanderen
 2nd Tour of Flanders
 2nd Paris–Roubaix
 2nd GP du Tournaisis
 2nd Nationale Sluitingsprijs
 3rd Omloop der Vlaamse Gewesten
 3rd Paris-Brussels
1965 – Wiel's-Groene Leeuw
 1st Omloop van Midden-Vlaanderen
 1st Plumeliau
 1st Trelissac
 2nd Brussels-Ingooigem
 3rd Dwars door West-Vlaanderen
1966 – Wiel's-Groene Leeuw
1967 – Tibetan-Pullover Centrale
1968 – Pullover Centrale-Motte

Tour de France record
 1963: 49th overall
 1964: 49th overall and 1 stage win
 1965: 47th overall

References

External links 

Official Tour de France results for Benoni Beheyt

1940 births
Living people
Belgian male cyclists
Belgian Tour de France stage winners
Flemish sportspeople
UCI Road World Champions (elite men)
Cyclists at the 1960 Summer Olympics
Olympic cyclists of Belgium
Sportspeople from Ghent
Cyclists from East Flanders